Alicia K. Harris is a Canadian film director and screenwriter. She attracted critical acclaim for her 2019 short film Pick, which won the Canadian Screen Award for Best Live Action Short Drama at the 8th Canadian Screen Awards in 2020.

Career 
From the Scarborough district of Toronto, Ontario, she is a graduate of the film program at Toronto Metropolitan University.

Harris wrote and directed her first short film, Fatherhood, in 2014, and won a local filmmaking award at the Scarborough Worldwide Film Festival. She followed up with the short films All Things But Forget (2015), Love Stinks (2016), and Maybe If It Were a Nice Room (2017), and has directed episodes of the Canadian television series Lockdown, The Parker Andersons, and Amelia Parker.

In 2018, she was one of eight women filmmakers selected for the Academy of Canadian Cinema and Television's Apprenticeship for Women Directors program, alongside Kathleen Hepburn, Kirsten Carthew, Allison White, Asia Youngman, Tiffany Hsiung, Halima Ouardiri, and Kristina Wagenbauer.

Her 2019 short film Pick won the Canadian Screen Award for Best Live Action Short Drama at the 8th Canadian Screen Awards in 2020.

For the 2020 Polaris Music Prize, which followed a unique format of commissioning filmmakers to make short films inspired by the shortlisted albums due to the COVID-19 pandemic in Canada preventing the staging of a traditional gala, Harris created a film based on Jessie Reyez's album Before Love Came to Kill Us.

In 2021, Harris directed Blackberries, a short film written by Canadian screenwriter Miali-Elise Coley-Sudlovenick, for CBC Gem and Obsidian Theatre's 21 Black Futures project.

The music video for Savannah Ré's single "Solid", which Harris directed, was a nominee for the 2021 Prism Prize. She received a Canadian Screen Award nomination for Best Direction in a Web Program or Series at the 10th Canadian Screen Awards in 2022, for the web series Next Stop.

References

External links

21st-century Canadian screenwriters
21st-century Canadian women writers
Canadian women screenwriters
Canadian women film directors
Black Canadian filmmakers
Black Canadian women
Film directors from Toronto
Writers from Scarborough, Toronto
Directors of Genie and Canadian Screen Award winners for Best Live Action Short Drama
Living people
Toronto Metropolitan University alumni
Year of birth missing (living people)